Hadrobregmus is a genus of beetles in the family Ptinidae.

Species include:
Hadrobregmus alternatus
Hadrobregmus americanus	 
Hadrobregmus bicolor
Hadrobregmus carpetanus
Hadrobregmus confusus
Hadrobregmus denticollis (Creutzer in Panzer, 1796)
Hadrobregmus notatus
Hadrobregmus pertinax Linnaeus, 1758
Hadrobregmus quadrulus
Hadrobregmus truncatus

References

Ptinidae